Capital punishment for murder was abolished in Cyprus on 15 December 1983. It was abolished for all crimes on 19 April 2002. The death penalty was replaced with life imprisonment. Cyprus is a signatory of the second optional protocol of the International Covenant on Civil and Political Rights which provides for full abolition of capital punishment. Cyprus initially had a reservation on the second protocol, allowing execution for grave crimes in times of war, but subsequently gave up this reservation. The Constitution of Cyprus was amended in 2016 to wipe out all forms of capital punishment.

The last executions were carried out on 13 June 1962. Three men, Hambis Zacharia, Michael Hiletikos and Lazaris Demetriou, were hanged for murder at the Central Jail of Nicosia, the country's only prison. Zacharia had killed a man in 1958 in a Limassol vineyard. Hiletikos and Demetriou were convicted of shooting a man outside a Limassol night-club in 1961. The British executioners Harry Allen and John Underhill travelled to Cyprus to carry out the hangings.

Prior to independence, nine men had been hanged in 1956 and 1957 by the British for acts committed as members of EOKA. The Central Jail of Nicosia still functions as a prison, but the area where executions were carried out is now a museum.

The unrecognised state of the Turkish Republic of Northern Cyprus retains the death penalty in limited circumstances. Article 15 of the state's constitution declares that capital punishment can be imposed in cases of treason during wartime, acts of terrorism and piracy jure gentium, and for repeated murders. Even in these instances, no execution of capital punishment can be carried out unless the Northern Cyprus legislative assembly decides so under the provisions of Article 78. , Northern Cyprus has never carried out an execution.

References 

Cyprus
Law of Cyprus
Death in Cyprus
Human rights abuses in Cyprus
2002 disestablishments in Cyprus